William Oxenham VC (July 1823 – 29 December 1875) was an English recipient of the Victoria Cross, the highest and most prestigious award for gallantry in the face of the enemy that can be awarded to British and Commonwealth forces.

Details
He was about 32 years old, and a corporal in the 32nd Regiment of Foot (later The Duke of Cornwall's Light Infantry), British Army during the Indian Mutiny when the following deed took place on 30 June 1857 at Siege of Lucknow, for which he was awarded the Victoria Cross:

The medal
His Victoria Cross is displayed at the Duke of Cornwall's Light Infantry Museum, Bodmin, Cornwall as are his campaign and good conduct medals.

References

Location of grave and VC medal (Devonshire)

1823 births
1875 deaths
Duke of Cornwall's Light Infantry soldiers
British recipients of the Victoria Cross
Indian Rebellion of 1857 recipients of the Victoria Cross
Military personnel from Tiverton, Devon
British military personnel of the Second Anglo-Sikh War
British Army recipients of the Victoria Cross
Burials in Devon